Trichura frigida is a moth in the subfamily Arctiinae. It was described by Hermann Burmeister in 1878. It is found in Argentina.

References

Moths described in 1878
Arctiini
Taxa named by Hermann Burmeister